United Bank Limited cricket team was a Pakistani domestic cricket team sponsored by United Bank Limited. The team was founded in 1975, and competed in various domestic competitions as a departmental team, principally in first-class cricket, winning nine championship trophies. Home matches were played at the United Bank Limited Sports Complex in Karachi.

UBL withdrew from domestic cricket in Pakistan in 1997 before returning in 2006, and regaining a place in first-class competition in 2011. In July 2018, United Bank Limited disbanded the team, with captain Younis Khan resigning as a result.

Honours

First-class cricket
 Quaid-e-Azam Trophy (4)
 1976–77
 1980–81
 1982–83
 1984–85
 Patron's Trophy (1)
 1996–97
 Pentangular Trophy (3)
 1983–84
 1990–91
 1995–96

List A cricket
 National One Day Championship (1)
 2017–18

Others
 Patron's Trophy Grade-II (1)
 2010–11

 National One Day Championship Division Two (1)
 2011–12

References

External links
 Lists of matches played by United Bank Limited
 Winners of the Quaid-e-Azam Trophy at Cricinfo
 United Bank Limited website
 Pakistan Cricket Board

1975 establishments in Pakistan
Pakistani first-class cricket teams
Cricket clubs established in 1975
Cricket clubs disestablished in 2018
2018 disestablishments in Pakistan